Murweh is a rural locality in the Shire of Murweh, Queensland, Australia.

History 
The town takes its name from the pastoral run, named in 1865 using an Aboriginal name for a large waterhole.

References 

Shire of Murweh
Localities in Queensland